California's 72nd State Assembly district is one of 80 California State Assembly districts. It is currently represented by Republican Diane Dixon.

District profile 
The district encompasses part of northern Orange County, including Little Saigon and some coastal communities. The district is primarily suburban and ethnically diverse.

Orange County – 15.6%
 Fountain Valley
 Garden Grove – 77.7%
 Huntington Beach – 50.6%
 Los Alamitos
 Midway City
 Rossmoor
 Santa Ana – 12.2%
 Seal Beach
 Westminster

Election results from statewide races

List of Assembly Members
Due to redistricting, the 72nd district has been moved around different parts of the state. The current iteration resulted from the 2011 redistricting by the California Citizens Redistricting Commission.

Election results 1992 - present

2020

2018

2016

2014

2012

2010

2008

2006

2004

2002

2000

1998

1996

1994

1992

See also 
 California State Assembly
 California State Assembly districts
 Districts in California

References

External links 
 District map from the California Citizens Redistricting Commission

72
Government in Orange County, California
Fountain Valley, California
Garden Grove, California
Huntington Beach, California
Los Alamitos, California
Rossmoor, California
Orange, California
Santa Ana, California
Seal Beach, California
Westminster, California